Bill McBirnie is a jazz and Latin flautist, based in Toronto, Ontario, Canada. He was raised in the small town of Port Colborne, Ontario, Canada.

Career
His has studied with Canadian flautist Robert Aitken, American flautist Samuel Baron, and Cuban charanga legend Richard Egues. 

McBirnie has recorded several albums under his own name. He has also recorded extensively as a sideman, including with Junior Mance, Irakere, Four80East, Memo Acevedo, and Emilie-Claire Barlow.

He has been a longstanding contributor to the Woodwinds Column of the Canadian Musician magazine, and was recruited personally by Sir James Galway to serve as his resident Jazz Flute Specialist.

He is also author of the book, The Technique and Theory of Improvisation: A practical guide for flutists, doublers, and other instrumentalists.

Awards and honors
The Silent Wish (with Bernie Senensky), was nominated for a Juno Award as Best Instrumental Album of the Year in 2020.

McBirnie was featured with Four80East in the #1 Billboard magazine Smooth Jazz hit, "Cinco Cinco Seis", in 2019. He was again featured by Four80East in the subsequent Billboard hit, "Ba Ba Brazil", in 2020.

Find You Place won the Vox Pop award in the Jazz Instrumental category at the 14th Annual Independent Music Awards (IMAs) in the US in 2016.

Grain of Sand (with Bruce Jones) won the Best Instrumental album category at the Toronto Independent Music Awards in 2016.

The venerable American flute maker, William S. Haynes Co., named him a Designated Haynes Artist in 2013.

Mercy (featuring Romani pianist, Robi Botos) was nominated in the Best Jazz Album category at the Independent Music Awards (IMAs) in the US in 2011.

Mercy (featuring Romani pianist, Robi Botos) also won a Toronto Independent Music Award (TIMA) in the Best Jazz Album category in 2010.

McBirnie was chosen Flutist of the Year by the Jazz Report Awards in 1999, and nominated as both Miscellaneous Instrumentalist of the Year and Best Album for "Paco Paco" at the National Jazz Awards in 2007.

McBirnie was solicited personally by Sir James Galway to serve as the resident Jazz Flute Specialist at his official website in 2005.

He is the only flutist to have won all three of the US National Flute Association's jazz flute Masterclass (2003), Big Band (2009) and Soloist (2012) Competitions, .

Discography

As leader
 1998 Desvio with Bruce Jones (Extreme Flute)
 2002 Scratch It! (Extreme Flute)
 2003 Nature Boy with Mark Eisenman (Extreme Flute)
 2006 Paco Paco with Bernie Senensky (Extreme Flute)
 2010 Mercy with Robi Botos (Extreme Flute)
 2013 Find Your Place with Bernie Senensky (Extreme Flute)
 2015 Grain of Sand with Bruce Jones (Extreme Flute)
 2018 The Silent Wish with Bernie Senensky (Extreme Flute)
 2021 Forever with Bruce Jones (Extreme Flute)

As sideman
 1992 Here 'Tis, Junior Mance, (Sackville Records)
 1994 Building Bridges, Memo Acevedo
 1995 Grey Angel, Jacek Kochan
 1996 Afrocubanismo Live!, Chucho Valdés
 2006 I Love Being Here with You, Dione Taylor
 2007 The Very Thought of You, Emilie-Claire Barlow
 2010 The Beat Goes On, Emilie-Claire Barlow
2012 Off Duty, Four80East
2018 Four on the Floor, Four80East
2020 Straight Round, Four80East
2022 Lou Pomanti & Friends, with Irene Torres

References

1953 births
Canadian jazz flautists
Canadian people of Irish descent
Living people
Musicians from Toronto
People from Port Colborne